David is an unincorporated community and coal town in Floyd County, Kentucky, United States along County Route 404. The town was named for David L. Francis, president of Princess Elkhorn Coal Company which originally built and owned the town. It bears the postal ZIP code 41616. The U.S. Census of 2000 recorded a population of 435. 

Although it was formerly a company town, it was in many ways a model coal community with many amenities not typical of the region at the time including a swimming pool, central water and sewer, and cable TV service. The company also supported a children's choir which toured nationally. When Princess-Elkhorn sold the community in the late 1960s, many of these amenities fell into disrepair and the housing stock deteriorated from over 100 units to slightly more than 30. The town rallied around a hepatitis outbreak and ended up purchasing the entire town from the investor who owned it. The mechanism for this purchase was the creation of the David Community Development Corporation, which went on to secure funding for a new water and sewer system, a fire station, a new park and several dozen new homes.

The David School is featured in the six-hour documentary film Country Boys which was broadcast in Frontline on PBS, about two residents, Chris and Cody, and their life in a poor, rural mountain town.

References

External links
David ON kyhometown.com

Unincorporated communities in Floyd County, Kentucky
Unincorporated communities in Kentucky
Company towns in Kentucky
Coal towns in Kentucky